This is a list of defunct airlines of Trinidad and Tobago.

See also
List of airlines of Trinidad and Tobago
List of airports in Trinidad and Tobago

References

 01
Trinidad and Tobago
Airlines
Airlines, defunct
Defunct companies of Trinidad and Tobago